Grevillea floripendula, commonly known as Ben Major grevillea or drooping grevillea, is a species of flowering plant in the family Proteaceae and is endemic to a restricted area of Victoria, Australia. It is a spreading, low-lying to prostrate shrub with divided leaves with toothed lobes and clusters of greenish to mauve and blackish flowers with a yellow to red style.

Description
The edges of the leaves are turned down and the lower surface has a few curly hairs.

Taxonomy
Grevillea floripendula was first formally described in 1981 by Raymond Vaughan Smith in the journal Muelleria from specimens he collected in the Ben Major Forest Reserve north of Beaufort in 1976.

Distribution and habitat
Ben Major grevillea grows in open forest within a localised area to the north of Beaufort between Waterloo and Ben Major Forest.

Conservationstatus 
Grevillea floripendula is listed as "vulnerable" under the Australian Government Environment Protection and Biodiversity Conservation Act and the Flora and Fauna Guarantee Act 1988 and a National Recovery Plan has been prepared. In 1997 about 4000 plants remained in its native range, in 21 separate populations. The main threats to the species include weed invasion, habitat loss and disturbance, and frequent bushfires.

See also
 List of Grevillea species

References

floripendula
Flora of Victoria (Australia)
Proteales of Australia
Plants described in 1981